The High Peak Estate is an area of Pennine moorland in the ownership of the National Trust in the Dark Peak area of Derbyshire, England.

The National Trust High Peak Estate is to be known as the 'Dark Peak Area' from summer 2010 which is now part of the Peak District Estate. The Peak District Estate also includes the White Peak Estate (formerly South Peak Estate) and the Longshaw Estate near Sheffield and includes a number of sites of interest including:

Alport Castles (a spectacular natural landslip)
Bleaklow (a massive expanse of wild, windswept moorland)
Derwent Edge
Kinder Scout (the moorland plateau that was the site of 1932's Mass Trespass and the highest point in the Peak District)
Mam Tor
Odin Mine (one of the oldest lead mines in the county)
Snake Pass (to the north-east of the estate)
Winnats Pass (west of Castleton)

See also
Forest of High Peak

External links
 High Peak Estate information at the National Trust
 Peak District, National Trust

National Trust properties in Derbyshire
Peak District
Tourist attractions in Derbyshire